Väinö Kirstinä (29 January 1936 - 23 September 2007) was a Finnish poet, journalist, translator and critic. He worked for the Finnish Broadcasting Corporation. He was the recipient of the Eino Leino Prize in 1981.

Kirstinä was born in Tyrnävä and went to school in Oulu. He later moved to central Helsinki, which inspired some of his later work.

Works

Poetry
 Lakeus (1961)
 Hitaat auringot (1963)
 Puhetta (Tammi, 1963)
 Pitkän tähtäyksen LSD-suunnitelma (Long-term LSD Plan) (Tammi, 1967)
 Säännöstelty eutanasia (Tammi, 1973)
 Elämä ilman sijaista (Tammi, 1977) 951-30-4218-9
 Hiljaisuudesta (Tammi, 1984) 
 Yötä, päivää (Tammi, 1986) 
 Vieroitusoireita (Tammi, 1994)

Essays
 Kirjarovioiden valot (Tammi, 1977) 951-30-3268-X  
 Puutarhassa (Tammi, 2003)  
 Kirjailijan tiet (Tammi, 2005)

Other
 Talo maalla (Tammi, 1969; diary)
 Runo ja lukija (Weilin + Göös, 1971; textbook)
 O niin kuin omena (Runogalleria, 1997)

References

1936 births
2007 deaths
People from Tyrnävä
Finnish writers
Writers from Northern Ostrobothnia
Recipients of the Eino Leino Prize